FernGully: The Last Rainforest is a 1992 independent animated musical fantasy film. The feature directorial debut by Bill Kroyer, FernGully was scripted by Jim Cox and adapted from the "FernGully" stories by Diana Young. The film is an Australian and American venture produced by Kroyer Films, Inc., Youngheart Productions, FAI Films and 20th Century Fox. It stars the voices of Samantha Mathis, Tim Curry, Christian Slater, Jonathan Ward, Robin Williams, and Grace Zabriskie. FernGully is set in an Australian rainforest inhabited by fairies including Crysta, who accidentally shrinks a young logger named Zak to the size of a fairy. Together, they rally the fairies and the animals of the rainforest to protect their home from the loggers and Hexxus, a malevolent pollution entity. Wayne Young, the film's producer, said the film was "blatantly environmental" though made an effort to avoid "preaching".

The film was released to mainly positive reviews, and was also generally considered a moderate financial success at both the box office and in home video sales. In 1998, it was followed by a direct-to-video sequel FernGully 2: The Magical Rescue, though none of the original voice cast reprised their roles.

Plot
Crysta is a fairy of curious nature who lives in FernGully, a picturesque rainforest free from human pollution. The fairies of FernGully once lived in harmony with humans, but believe them to have gone extinct after having been driven away by a dark spirit named Hexxus. Crysta is the apprentice of Magi, a fairy who imprisoned Hexxus in a tree. One day, Crysta explores a new part of the forest and meets Batty Koda, a bat who claims to have been experimented on by humans, giving him a manic and deluded personality. However, fairies refuse to believe him except for Crysta who volunteers to investigate the situation. She meets Zak, a young lumberjack whom Crysta accidentally shrinks when she tries to save him from being crushed by a falling tree, though does not know how to restore him to normal size. Zak initially believes Crysta to be hostile, but gains trust in her when she saves him from a hungry goanna.

The tree that Hexxus is imprisoned in is cut down by Zak's supervisors Tony and Ralph. Hexxus quickly begins to regain his powers by feeding on pollution. He manipulates Tony and Ralph to drive to FernGully. In FernGully, Zak meets Pips, a fairy jealous of Zak's relationship with Crysta. Zak begins to fall in love with Crysta, but hides the true reason that the humans had returned. When the signs of Hexxus's resurrection begin to manifest themselves in poisoned trees and rivers, Zak finally admits that humans are destroying the forest. The fairies mount an attempt to defend their homes. Knowing their fight is hopeless, Zak convinces Batty to aid him in stopping the machine before it destroys them. When Zak makes his presence known to Tony and Ralph, Hexxus takes over the machine and begins to wildly destroy the forest.

Magi sacrifices herself to give the fairies a chance, and she tells Crysta to remember everything she's learned. Zak manages to stop the machine, depriving Hexxus the source of his power, but he manifests himself within the oil in the machine and begins to ignite the forest ablaze. Crysta sacrifices herself by allowing herself to be devoured by Hexxus and all seems lost until he begins to sprout limbs and leaves like a tree. Pips and the rest of the fairies rally to the powers they have been given, which causes the seed that Crysta fed Hexxus to start growing wildly. Hexxus and the machine are both simultaneously imprisoned by the newly grown tree at the very border of FernGully which bursts into bloom.

Crysta appears after the fight, having survived, and succeeds Magi as a magical fairy. She gives Zak a seed, begging him to remember everything that has transpired, and she forlornly restores him to his human size. Remembering the seed in his hand, Zak promises to remember his adventure, and buries the seed in the soil before telling Tony and Ralph that things need to change as they leave the forest behind. The seed sprouts new growth for FernGully as Crysta playfully chases Pips with Batty following.

Cast

 Samantha Mathis as Crysta
 Jonathan Ward as Zak
 Tim Curry as Hexxus
 Christian Slater as Pips
 Robin Williams as Batty Koda
 Grace Zabriskie as Narrator/Magi Lune
 Geoffrey Blake as Ralph
 Robert Pastorelli as Tony
 Cheech Marin as Stump
 Tommy Chong as Root
 Tone Loc as Goanna
 Townsend Coleman as Knotty
 Brian Cummings as Ock
 Kathleen Freeman as Elder #1
 Janet Gilmore as Fairy #1
 Naomi Lewis as Elder #2
 Danny Mann as Ash, Voice Dispatch
 Neil Ross as Elder #3
 Pamela Segall as Fairy #2
 Anderson Wong as Rock

Themes
In the book Disney, Pixar, and the Hidden Messages of Children's Films, M. Keith Booker states that FernGully "focuses on the theme of the destruction of the Earth's rainforests. In this case the rainforest is located near Mount Warning, on the eastern coast of Australia, but the theme is global, and the specific location is not particularly emphasized". Despite the environmental theme, Booker stated the film was "somewhat vague in its explanation of the dire consequences of rainforest destruction, and it addresses the economic impetus behind this destruction hardly at all"; the fact that the rainforest was saved at the end of the film "diminishes the urgency of its environmentalist message" and that the character of Hexxus "displaces the real blame for environmental destruction from its real perpetrators onto nonexistent supernatural perpetrators, further diluting the political message." The character of Batty was said to introduce "the secondary theme of animal experimentation, though with a light touch that presents this potentially horrifying motif as essentially humorous."

In the book Eco-Impacts and the Greening of Postmodernity, Tom Jagtenberg and David McKie comment that radical views of ecology flourished in the film, perhaps because it was "aimed at a younger generation ... and belong[s] to relatively discredited genres". As Zak is shrunk to fairy size and integrated into the fairy world, more similarities rather than differences are implied with the nonhuman characters. Crysta is said to defeat the evil Hexxus "in the manner of classic western genre heroes", though with the key difference that her weapon is a seed rather than a revolver, allowing the produce of nature to share the heroic role with her.

Production
Producer Wayne Young said his passion for the environment was his motivation for making the film, saying the film was "blatantly environmental, although we have gone to a lot of trouble to avoid preaching. We also want it to be viewed as entertainment." The inspiration for FernGully came from stories written by his former wife, Diana Young. Diana first wrote the story of FernGully 15 years before the film's release. Wayne said the couple planned a film adaptation for five years, then spent "seven years of dreaming and hustling, followed by another three years of production". Wayne stated their dream was not possible until the success of Walt Disney Feature Animation's 1989 film The Little Mermaid, which brought popularity back to animation. Hand-drawn scenes in the film were complemented by computer animation, which was used to create elements such as flocks of birds that would have taken much longer to animate traditionally. Kroyer states 40,000 frames of computer-generated graphics were used in the film, and that the use of such animation halved the production time. Most of the film's $24 million budget was spent on the animation and the soundtrack.

The film marked Robin Williams's first animation role, with the character Batty Koda being created specifically for him. Williams provided 14 hours' worth of improvised lines for the part, which had been originally conceived as an eight-minute role. Director Bill Kroyer was so impressed with the voice work, he ended up tripling the screen time given to the character. Williams went on to provide the voice of the Genie in Disney's Aladdin later the same year, receiving critical acclaim. Williams had already agreed to voice Batty Koda before being approached to do Aladdin. Jeffrey Katzenberg, then-chairman of Walt Disney Studios, tried to force Williams to withdraw from FernGully, on the grounds he did not want him voicing two animated characters around the same time, but Williams refused. According to Wayne Young, Disney repeatedly interfered with the production of FernGully, twice taking over spaces the producers had rented by offering to pay more. When the producers eventually set up a studio in a former brewery in the San Fernando Valley, Disney attempted to purchase it. Katzenberg declined to comment on the issue when approached by Vanity Fair in 2017.

The voice cast of FernGully agreed with the film's message, and worked for scale wages. The film marked the first time that both members of Cheech & Chong had worked together in six years, with the two voicing beetle brothers Stump and Root. Cheech Marin said "It was just like old times, but we only worked for two or three hours, had a pizza and split."

Music
The film's score was composed and produced by Alan Silvestri. It was released as an album and consisted of 14 tracks, running just under 44 minutes in length.

Soundtrack
The soundtrack album was released by MCA Records. Peter Fawthrop from Allmusic gave the album three out of five stars, commenting that the songs were "lighter and more pop-driven than Disney soundtracks from the '90s, but they are not childish." All songs on the soundtrack were performed in the film.

Release
FernGully was released in the United States on April 10, 1992, and in Australia on September 17. The film was shown at the United Nations General Assembly on Earth Day, April 22, 1992.

Box office
FernGully grossed US$32.7 million worldwide, including $24.7 million from the United States, and A$3.4 million in Australia. The box office performance was described as a moderate success though it grossed below expectations, possibly because of its ecological message. Joseph Gelmis from Newsday, however, described FernGullys box office performance as "dismal", though noted it was the most successful recent non-Disney animated film. Co-executive producer Jaime Willett and Josh Baran, who worked on the film's marketing, both spoke of the difficulties of getting attention to an animated film that was not produced by Disney, with Willett stating box office revenue would have at least doubled by simply having the headline "Walt Disney presents" on the film. USA Today noted that the combined box office gross of FernGully and the five other non-Disney animated films released in 1992 did not even equal a third of the gross for Disney's 1991 film Beauty and the Beast.

Critical response
On Rotten Tomatoes, the film has an approval rating of 67% based on reviews from 18 critics, with an average rating of 6.4/10. On Metacritic, the film has a score of 67 out of 100 based on reviews from 15 critics, indicating "generally favorable reviews". Audiences surveyed by CinemaScore gave the film a grade "A" on scale of A to F.

Roger Ebert of the Chicago Sun-Times gave it three out of four stars, saying the film was visually "very pleasing," told a "useful lesson", "and although the movie is not a masterpiece it's pleasant to watch for its humor and sweetness." Hollis Chacona from The Austin Chronicle added that the film was "funny, pretty, touching, scary, magical stuff." Janet Maslin of The New York Times had an unfavorable impression of the film, describing it as "[a]n uncertain blend of sanctimonious principles and Saturday-morning cartoon aesthetics". According to Wayne Young, Jeffrey Katzenberg called the producers of FernGully to tell them that he loved the film.

Legacy
Wayne Young stated that portions of the film's gross would be donated to Greenpeace, the Rainforest Foundation Fund, and the Sierra Club, as well as a special fund benefiting environmental projects worldwide that was administered by the Smithsonian Institution, though he did not disclose exact figures. The film also inspired a 1992 video game by Capstone Software and IntraCorp called The FernGully Computerized Coloring Book. In 1998 the film was followed by a direct-to-video sequel, FernGully 2: The Magical Rescue.

FAI Films, which only ever produced FernGully and its sequel, was acquired by HIH Insurance in 1998. HIH closed in 2001. In June 2012, administrators for HIH placed advertisements trying to sell the rights to both films. On November 11th, 2021 Shout! Factory announced a deal with Machine Media Advisors, stated to be the owner of the rights to FernGully, for worldwide distribution rights to the film.

Some reviewers have commented that the 2009 James Cameron film Avatar plagiarized thematic and plot elements from FernGully, though others have stated it is simply one of many films that Avatar is similar to, or have dismissed the comparison entirely. The 2013 film Epic was also said to have an unoriginal plot similar to FernGully.

Home media
Four months after the theatrical release, 20th Century Fox Home Entertainment, under its previous name "Fox Video", released FernGully on VHS and LaserDisc on August 26, 1992. Sales were strong, with approximately five million units sold by 1998, including 125,000 in Australia.

Fox re-released the film on DVD in 2001. Christopher Simons from DVD Talk gave the 2001 DVD three-and-a-half stars out of five for both audio and video, though only one star for special features, noting that the only extras included were trailers for other films. A "Family Fun Edition" DVD was released in 2005. Special features included commentary with director Bill Kroyer, art director Ralph Eggleston, and coordinating art director Susan Kroyer, several featurettes including the original featurette from 1992, the music video for If I'm Gonna Eat Somebody (It Might As Well Be You) by Tone Loc, as well as trailers and TV spots. Scott Weinberg from DVD Talk gave this version four stars out of five for both audio and video, and also four stars for special features.

For its 20th anniversary, FernGully was released on Blu-ray Disc on March 6, 2012, containing the same special features as the "Family Fun Edition". Aaron Peck from High Def Digest gave it three out of five stars for video quality, four stars for audio and three-and-a-half stars for extras. Brian Orndorf from Blu-ray.com gave the release three out of five stars for video quality, three-and-a-half stars for audio and four stars for special features. Shout! Factory released Ferngully on Blu-ray in 2022 as part of its 30th anniversary.

Notes

See also
Once Upon a Forest (1993), another Fox-distributed animated film with an environmental theme.

References

External links

FernGully: The Last Rainforest at Don Markstein's Toonopedia

1992 animated films
1992 films
1990s American animated films
1990s Australian animated films
1990s musical drama films
20th Century Fox animated films
20th Century Fox films
American children's animated action films
American children's animated adventure films
American children's animated comedy films
American children's animated drama films
American children's animated fantasy films
American children's animated musical films
American musical fantasy films
Animated films about animals
Australian animated fantasy films
Animated films based on children's books
1990s children's fantasy films
Environmental fiction books
Environmental films
Films about animal rights
Films about fairies and sprites
Films about bats
Animated films about lizards
Films scored by Alan Silvestri
Films set in jungles
Films set in New South Wales
Films about size change
1992 directorial debut films
Films directed by Bill Kroyer
1990s children's animated films
Rough Draft Studios films
1990s English-language films
1992 independent films
American independent films
Australian independent films